George Marsh (born 9 June 1938) is a Canadian former sports shooter. He competed in two events at the 1964 Summer Olympics.

References

1938 births
Living people
Canadian male sport shooters
Olympic shooters of Canada
Shooters at the 1964 Summer Olympics
Place of birth missing (living people)